Sajjad Zareeian Jahromi (Known as Mohammad Bakhshijahromi or bakhshijahromi born 1995, in Tehran) is an Iranian professional squash player. As of February 2018, he was ranked number 143 in the world.

References

1997 births
Living people
Iranian male squash players
Squash players at the 2018 Asian Games
Asian Games competitors for Iran